The International Teaching Centre (ITC) is a Baháʼí institution based in the Baháʼí World Centre in Haifa, Israel. Its duties are to stimulate and coordinate the Continental Board of Counselors and assist the Universal House of Justice in matters relating to the teaching and protection of the faith.

The duties of the International Teaching Centre include coordinating, stimulating, and directing the activities of the Continental Boards of Counsellors and acting as liaison between them and the Universal House of Justice.

History
The institution was first formed in 1973 by the Universal House of Justice, and the inaugural meeting was held on June 14, 1973. The International Teaching Centre originally consisted of the 17 Hands of the Cause of God still living at that time, plus three Counsellor members. The number of Counsellor members was raised to four in 1979, to seven in 1983, and finally to the current nine in 1988. The Counsellor members of the International Teaching Center are appointed by the Universal House of Justice to five-year terms that begin shortly after the International Convention and election of the Universal House of Justice. Members may be appointed to more than one term.

Counsellor Members
Members are entered in the table under the year when they were first appointed. Starting with the first appointments in 1973, regular appointments have occurred every five years with appointments made in other years either due to the death of a member or the election of a member to the Universal House of Justice in one of the five by-elections to that body.  All members have continued to serve after subsequent re-appointments by the Universal House of Justice.  Members of the International Teaching Centre who were subsequently elected to the Universal House of Justice have their names italicized in the table.

Publications
 Training Institutes: Attaining a Higher Level of Functioning (January 2017)
 Insights from the Frontiers of Learning (April 2013)
 Attaining Dynamics of Growth: Glimpses from Five Continents (April 2008)
 Building Momentum: A Coherent Approach to Growth (April 2003)

See also
Continental Counsellors
Custodians

References

External links
A glossary from the official Baháʼí news site.

Bahá'í institutions